Savino is an urban locality (a settlement) and the administrative center of Savinsky District of Ivanovo Oblast, Russia, located  south of Ivanovo, near the Uvod and Shizhegda Rivers. Population: 

It was founded in 1869 as a settlement at the railway station of Yegoryevskaya and was later renamed Savino. It was granted urban-type settlement status in 1938.

References

Urban-type settlements in Tver Oblast